The Augrabies Falls  is a waterfall on the Orange River, the largest river in South Africa. Since 1966 the waterfall, set in a desolate and rugged milieu, is enclosed by the Augrabies Falls National Park. Some sources cite an approximate height of 480 feet; this is actually the height from the base of the canyon to the top of the walls, not that of the falls themselves.

Exploration
The original Khoikhoi residents named the waterfall "Ankoerebis" — "place of great noise" — from which the Trek Boers, who settled here later on, derived the name, "Augrabies". The last leader of area's native residents was Klaas Pofadder who lived on an island upstream of the falls, now known as Klaas Island. The first westerner to see the falls was the renegade Swedish mercenary Hendrik Jakob Wikar. He arrived at the falls in October 1778, after years long wanderings in the wilderness. When another traveler, George Thompson, was led to the falls by his Koranna guides in 1826, he named it after King George IV.

Size

Dangers
Since 1966, more than 20 people have fallen to their death in the gorge, and five have been swept over the falls. A Scandinavian tourist however survived a fall into the gorge in 1979, as did a man who was swept over the falls in October 1981. The bodies of others were trapped in the plunge pool below and never found. Similarly, animals including cattle and hippopotamuses have been swept over the falls.

Folklore
Folklore among early twentieth-century South African prospectors describes the pool beneath the King George Cataract as being filled with diamonds, which are carried by currents down the Orange River. Additionally, the pool is also claimed to be the lair of a serpentine monster called the Grootslang.

See also
List of waterfalls by flow rate

References

External links
https://www.sanparks.org/parks/augrabies/

Augrabies Falls National Park

Waterfalls of South Africa
Orange River
Landforms of the Northern Cape
Nature reserves in South Africa
Tributaries of the Orange River